Jetmore is a city in and the county seat of Hodgeman County, Kansas, United States.  As of the 2020 census, the population of the city was 770.

History
Jetmore was originally called Buckner, and was laid out under the latter name in 1879. The name was changed to Jetmore in 1880 in honor of Col. Abraham Buckles Jetmore.  A lawyer from Topeka, Abraham Jetmore was instrumental in securing a railroad line through the city and in arranging for it to become the county seat.

Geography
Jetmore is located at  (38.084137, -99.895999). The Buckner Creek, a tributary of the Pawnee River, flows through Jetmore.

The surface rocks in this area consist of Greenhorn limestone and Graneros shale.

Climate
The climate in this area is characterized by hot, humid summers and generally mild to cool winters.  According to the Köppen Climate Classification system, Jetmore has a humid subtropical climate, abbreviated "Cfa" on climate maps.

Demographics

2010 census
As of the census of 2010, there were 867 people, 366 households, and 232 families residing in the city. The racial makeup of the city was 96.3% White, 0.1% African American, 0.1% Native American, 0.5% Asian, 1.7% from other races, and 1.3% from two or more races. Hispanic or Latino of any race were 4.6% of the population.

There were 366 households, of which 32.2% had children under the age of 18 living with them, 50.8% were married couples living together, 6.6% had a female householder with no husband present, 6.0% had a male householder with no wife present, and 36.6% were non-families. 33.6% of all households were made up of individuals, and 22.2% had someone living alone who was 65 years of age or older. The average household size was 2.33 and the average family size was 2.97.

The median age in the city was 42.1 years. 26.2% of residents were under the age of 18; 5.4% were between the ages of 18 and 24; 21.9% were from 25 to 44; 24.8% were from 45 to 64; and 21.8% were 65 years of age or older. The gender makeup of the city was 47.4% male and 52.6% female.

2000 census

As of the census of 2000, there were 903 people, 362 households, and 241 families residing in the city. The racial makeup of the city was 96.79% White, 1.22% African American, 0.11% Native American, 0.22% from other races, and 1.66% from two or more races. Hispanic or Latino of any race were 2.99% of the population.

There were 362 households, out of which 33.7% had children under the age of 18 living with them, 57.5% were married couples living together, 5.5% had a female householder with no husband present, and 33.4% were non-families. 31.2% of all households were made up of individuals, and 18.8% had someone living alone who was 65 years of age or older. The average household size was 2.40 and the average family size was 3.02.

In the city, the population was spread out, with 27.7% under the age of 18, 5.0% from 18 to 24, 25.5% from 25 to 44, 19.9% from 45 to 64, and 21.9% who were 65 years of age or older. The median age was 40 years. For every 100 females, there were 88.5 males. For every 100 females age 18 and over, there were 88.2 males.

The median income for a household in the city was $33,618, and the median income for a family was $39,375. Males had a median income of $27,917 versus $24,250 for females. The per capita income for the city was $15,510. About 10.9% of families and 14.0% of the population were below the poverty line, including 19.4% of those under age 18 and 7.5% of those age 65 or over.

Education
The community is served by Jetmore USD 227 public school district. The district has two schools:
 Hodgeman County Middle/High School
 Hodgeman County Elementary School

Transportation

Airports
 Jetmore Municipal Airport (No commercial flights)

Highways

See also
 Tornadoes of 1972

References

Further reading

External links

 City of Jetmore
 Jetmore - Directory of Public Officials
 Early History of Jetmore, 1912
 Jetmore City Map, KDOT

Cities in Kansas
County seats in Kansas
Cities in Hodgeman County, Kansas
1879 establishments in Kansas
Populated places established in 1879